Angela Kulikov and Rianna Valdes were the defending champions, having won the previous edition in 2019 but lost in the quarterfinals to Usue Maitane Arconada and Cristina Bucșa.

Peangtarn Plipuech and Jessy Rompies won the title, defeating Arconada and Bucșa in the final, 3–6, 7–6(7–5), [10–8].

Seeds

Draw

Draw

References

External Links
Main Draw

Thoreau Tennis Open - Doubles